Heliamphora ceracea is a species of marsh pitcher plant known only from the Brazilian side of Pico da Neblina in the Neblina Massif. It has been collected from an elevation of 1900 m.

References

Further reading

 AIPC Special Issue 4: News of 2011. Associazione Italiana Piante Carnivore.

ceracea
Flora of Brazil
Plants described in 2011
Flora of the Tepuis